is a Japanese painter, writer, and actress. She is best known for her role of the villainess Kayako Saeki in The Grudge 3 (2009), taking over for Takako Fuji, who had passed on the role.

Career
Her acting career began in episodic Television work as a non featured performer in such series as EastEnders and Holby City. She furthered her acting career by appearing as an extra in various films such as Die Another Day (2002), Charlie and the Chocolate Factory (2005), and Rabbit Fever (2006). Horiuchi is a friend of Tim Burton in real life, which led to her being cast in his Charlie and the Chocolate Factory film. She plays the clerk at the Japanese candy store, who lets in all the children ready to buy Wonka Bars in the hopes of getting a Golden Ticket.

Horiuchi starred in The Grudge 3 (2009) as Kayako Saeki, the vengeful ghost of the Ju-on series (called "The Grudge"), taking over for Takako Fuji who had passed on the role. Her performance received a mixed, if not muted, response.

Filmography

References

External links
 

Japanese actresses
Living people
Year of birth missing (living people)